Guntis Ulmanis (born September 13, 1939), also known as Guntis Rumpītis from 1949 to 1989, is a Latvian politician and the fifth President of Latvia from 1993 to 1999.

Biography

Early life
Guntis Ulmanis was born in Riga on September 13, 1939. His great uncle Kārlis Ulmanis was Latvian Prime Minister. In 1941 following the Soviet occupation, Guntis Ulmanis and his family were deported to Krasnoyarsk Krai, Siberia, Russian SFSR.

In 1946, they returned to Latvia, but were not allowed to settle in Riga, so they stayed at Ēdole in the Kuldīga area of the Latvian SSR.

In 1949, the remainder of the Ulmanis family was supposed to be deported in the upcoming March deportation, but Guntis Ulmanis was able to avoid that fate, as his mother remarried and his surname was changed to Rumpītis.

They then moved to Jūrmala, where he attended school. After graduating, he entered the economic faculty of the Latvian State University.

Career in Latvia
After completing his studies in the university in 1963, he was drafted into the Soviet army, where he served for two years. In 1965 he joined the Communist Party of the Soviet Union. He began working as an economist at a construction site and was later promoted to tram and trolleybus administrator in Riga.

He was then advanced to the position of deputy chairman of the planning committee of the Riga Executive Committee (city government). However, his family ties with President Ulmanis were discovered and he was sacked in 1971.

He then worked at lower positions in the Riga municipal service system. For some time he worked as a teacher of construction economics at the Riga Polytechnical Institute and of economic planning at the Latvian State University.

In 1989, during the Singing Revolution, Guntis Rumpītis quit the Communist Party and returned to using his original surname – Ulmanis. In 1992, he was appointed Council Member of the National Bank of Latvia.

He also joined the Latvian Farmers' Union the same year. In 1993 the Saeima elected him as the 5th President of Latvia (the first since the full restoration of independence in 1991). In the first round, he finished third (after Gunārs Meierovics and Aivars Jerumanis), but won in the runoff as Meierovics quit the race.

Presidency

As President, Guntis Ulmanis focused on foreign policy, building relations with international and regional organizations, as well as other countries. A major achievement was the conclusion of the Latvian-Russian treaty on the withdrawal of Russian Armed Forces from Latvia.

During his presidency, Latvia joined the Council of Europe and sent its application to the European Union. He announced a moratorium on the death penalty, in accordance with the norms of the European Council.

In 1996, he was re-elected in the first round of elections, defeating Saeima speaker Ilga Kreituse, Imants Liepa and former Communist Party chairman Alfrēds Rubiks, who was in jail at the time.

In 1998 President Ulmanis actively supported amendments to the Citizenship law, that would allow all people born after August 21, 1991, to obtain citizenship and would eliminate so-called "naturalization limits" (in which only a limited number of non-citizenship could receive citizenship within a given year). However, he was forced to send the law project on a referendum, after 36 nationalistic deputies, opposed to the amendment petitioned him to do so. He then actively and successfully campaigned for the adoption of the amendments by the population.

Retirement and subsequent return to politics
Guntis Ulmanis' term finished in 1999 and he was succeeded by Vaira Vīķe-Freiberga. He retired from politics but became a social activist, founding the Guntis Ulmanis Fund, organizing the 2006 IIHF World Championship in Riga and heading the Riga Castle reconstruction council.

2010 marked a return to big politics for Guntis Ulmanis. He became the chairman of the newly created party alliance For a Good Latvia, which was composed of the People's Party and Latvia's First Party/Latvian Way. The alliance won only 8 seats in the October 2010 parliamentary election.

However, Ulmanis became a Saeima deputy. In 2011 he announced he did not want to run for another term as a deputy in the 2011 election. He, therefore, ceased being a deputy in November 2011, after the 11th Saeima was inaugurated.

Personal life

Guntis Ulmanis has been married to Aina Ulmane (maiden name Štelce) since 1962. They have two children: Guntra (b. 1963) and Alvils (b. 1966) and three grandchildren. In his spare time, Ulmanis enjoys reading history books and memoirs, playing tennis, basketball and volleyball. He is known to also spend summers in his home in Smārde Parish.

He has written two autobiographies: No tevis jau neprasa daudz (Not much is required from you yet) (1995) and Mans prezidenta laiks (My time as President) (1999).

He is a member of the international advisory council of the Victims of Communism Memorial Foundation.

On September 21, 2015 he became CEO of the hockey club Dinamo Riga after the previous CEO Aigars Kalvītis stepped down to take a CEO position in the company Latvijas Gāze.

Honours

National honours
 :
 Commander Grand Cross with Chain of the Order of the Three Stars

Foreign honours
 :
 Knight of the Order of the Elephant (18 March 1997) - See Latvian Knights of the Order of the Elephant
:
 Collar of the Order of the Cross of Terra Mariana (23 October 1996)
 :
 Grand Cross Special Class of the Order of Merit of the Federal Republic of Germany
 :
 Knight Grand Cross of the Order of the Falcon (8 June 1998)
 :
 Knight Grand Cross of the Order of St. Olav
 :
 Order of the White Eagle

References

1939 births
Living people
Politicians from Riga
Communist Party of the Soviet Union members
Latvian Farmers' Union politicians
Presidents of Latvia
Deputies of the 5th Saeima
Deputies of the 10th Saeima
Academic staff of Riga Technical University
Dinamo Riga

Knights Grand Cross of the Order of the Falcon 
Recipients of the Collar of the Order of the Cross of Terra Mariana
Grand Crosses Special Class of the Order of Merit of the Federal Republic of Germany
Recipients of the Order of the White Eagle (Poland)